Charan 13 station, is an elevated railway station on MRT Blue Line. The station opened on 23 December 2019. The station is one of the nine stations of phase 3 of MRT Blue Line.

The station is located above Charan Sanitwong Road at Phanitchayakan Thon Buri Junction, also known as Soi Charan 13 or Soi Phanit Thon where Charan Sanitwong meet with Soi Charan Sanitwong 13, which is a large and deeply alley, and is the location of the Thonburi Commercial College and many temples with shortcut to Ratchapruek, Bang Waek and Phet Kasem Roads in Phasi Charoen area.

Nearby places
Bangkok Yai area
Siam Technology College
Wat Duduat
Phasi Charoen area
Wat Pak Nam Fang Tai
Bang Sao Thong Police Station
Wat Wichitkarnnimit (Wat Nang)
Thonburi Commercial College
Taling Chan area
Wat Pak Nam Fang Nuea

References

MRT (Bangkok) stations